Neoleleupidia kochi is a species of beetle in the family Carabidae, the only species in the genus Neoleleupidia.

References

Dryptinae